Harry Dickason (16 December 1884 – 3 December 1943) was an English seaman.

Dickason was a survivor of Robert Falcon Scott's Antarctic Terra Nova expedition, and was one of six arctic explorers that were part of its Northern Party. Mount Dickason in Antarctica, at the head of the Boomerang Glacier, is named after him.

References 

1884 births
1943 deaths
Explorers of Antarctica
People from Clifton, Bristol
Recipients of the Polar Medal
Terra Nova expedition
Recipients of the Distinguished Service Medal (United Kingdom)
Royal Navy sailors
Royal Navy personnel of World War I
Royal Navy personnel of the Russian Civil War